Decider is both a real word and a "Bushism". It may refer to:

Decider (website), a pop culture website operated by the New York Post
Bill Maher: The Decider, a stand-up comedy special
Decider (Turing machine), a Turing machine that eventually halts for every input
"The Decider", a recurring segment on The Daily Show
"The Decider", an issue of Tales of the Teenage Mutant Ninja Turtles
Posek (Hebrew for "decider/decisor"), a type of Jewish legal scholar
Roger (American Dad!), from American Dad!, was led to believe he was "The Decider"

See also
Decide (disambiguation)